Eder Alberto Hermoza Guevara (born 4 April 1990) is a Peruvian footballer who plays for Universidad César Vallejo in the Torneo Descentralizado, as a goalkeeper.

Club career
Eder Hermoza began his career with Alianza Lima, joining their first team in January 2008. There he found few chances to feature for the first team as he had to compete with regular keepers Enrique Bologna, Salomon Libman, George Forsyth, and up-and-comer Juan Goyoneche. He finished his time in Alianza without making any league appearances in the 2008 season.

In January 2009 he joined Sport Ancash. There he made his Torneo Descentralizado league debut on 15 February 2009 at home to José Gálvez FBC. Manager Eduardo Asca played Hermoza from the start, but he could not keep a clean-sheet on his debut as his side lost 1–2. Hermoza played in a total of nine league matches in his debut season.

International career 
Hermoza was the starting goalkeeper for the Peru U17 side in the 2007 FIFA U-17 World Cup.

He later featured for the Peru U20 squad in 2009.

References

1990 births
Living people
Footballers from Lima
Peruvian footballers
Club Alianza Lima footballers
Sport Áncash footballers
Total Chalaco footballers
Club Deportivo Universidad César Vallejo footballers
Peruvian Primera División players
Association football goalkeepers